Moiben is a settlement in Moiben Constituency, of Uasin Gishu County of Kenya's former Rift Valley Province.

References 

Populated places in Uasin Gishu County